Luis Rodolfo López Meneses (born 20 June 1951) is a Guatemalan former footballer who played as a midfielder.

Career
López played club football for Juventud Retalteca. In 1988, López was selected in Guatemala's football squad for the 1988 Summer Olympics in South Korea. He made one appearance at the tournament, in a 4–0 defeat to Zambia on 21 September. In 2012, López became manager of Primera División de Ascenso side Deportivo Ayutla.

References

External links

1951 births
Living people
Place of birth missing (living people)
Guatemalan footballers
Guatemala international footballers
Olympic footballers of Guatemala
Footballers at the 1988 Summer Olympics
Association football midfielders
Liga Nacional de Fútbol de Guatemala players
Juventud Retalteca players
Deportivo Ayutla managers
Guatemalan football managers